Doomsday Rock is a 1997 made-for-TV science fiction film about an asteroid on a collision course with Earth. The film premiered on The Family Channel on August 24, 1997.

Plot
An astronomer named Dr. Karl Sorenson believes that an asteroid is on a collision course with Earth, but few other scientists believe him. Desperate, he leads a group of militant followers to take over a nuclear missile silo in order to use its missiles to destroy the asteroid.

Cast
 William Devane as Dr. Karl Sorenson
 Connie Sellecca as Katherine
 Ed Marinaro as Paul, FBI Agent
 Jessica Walter as Secretary
 Roger Cross as Gibson
 Gary Jones as Gil Naspeth
 Rick Ravanello as Parks
 Jason Gray-Stanford as Sgt. Thompson
 Manoj Sood as Missile Commander

References

External links

Review at Badastronomy.com

1997 films
1997 television films
ABC Family original films
American disaster films
Films about impact events
1990s science fiction films
Fiction about near-Earth asteroids
Films directed by Brian Trenchard-Smith
1990s English-language films
1990s American films